Atef Abu Bilal is a Palestinian-Israeli footballer currently playing for Markaz Balata as a  winger. He received his first call up to the Palestine national football team in 2010 against Sudan. He has since played for Palestine at the 2010 WAFF Championship, the qualifying rounds of 2012 AFC Challenge Cup, and the 2014 World Cup qualifying.

References

1984 births
Living people
Bedouin Israelis
Israeli Muslims
Footballers from Shaqib al-Salam
Bedouins in the State of Palestine
Palestinian footballers
Palestine international footballers
Maccabi Be'er Sheva F.C. players
Maccabi Ironi Netivot F.C. players
Shabab Al-Dhahiriya SC players
Shabab Al-Khalil SC players
F.C. Be'er Sheva players
Nordia Jerusalem F.C. players
F.C. Dimona players
Markaz Balata players
West Bank Premier League players
Association football wingers
Arab citizens of Israel
Arab-Israeli footballers